The 1990–91 season was the 75th season in the existence of RCD Mallorca and the club's second consecutive season in the top flight of Spanish football. In addition to the domestic league, Mallorca participated in this season's editions of the Copa del Rey.

Competitions

Overall record

La Liga

League table

Results summary

Results by round

Matches

Copa del Rey

Round of 64

Round of 32

Round of 16

Quarter-finals

Semi-finals

Final

References

RCD Mallorca seasons
Mallorca